Micropentila adelgitha, the common dots, is a butterfly in the family Lycaenidae. It is found in Ivory Coast, Ghana, Nigeria (south and the Cross River loop), Cameroon, Gabon, the Republic of the Congo and the Democratic Republic of the Congo (Ituri). The habitat consists of primary forests.

Adults feed from extrafloral nectaries of Marantaceae species.

References

Butterflies described in 1874
Poritiinae
Butterflies of Africa
Taxa named by William Chapman Hewitson